The Compagnie de Chine was a French trading company established in 1660 by the Catholic society Compagnie du Saint-Sacrement, in order to dispatch missionaries to Asia (initially Bishops François Pallu, Pierre Lambert de la Motte and Ignace Cotolendi of the newly founded Paris Foreign Missions Society). The company was modelled on the Dutch East India Company.

A ship was built in the Netherlands by the shipowner Fermanel, but the ship foundered soon after being launched. The only remaining solution for the missionaries was to travel on land, since Portugal would have refused to take non-Padroado missionaries by ship, and the Dutch and the English refused to take Catholic missionaries.

In 1664, the China Company would be fused by Jean-Baptiste Colbert with the Compagnie d'Orient and Compagnie de Madagascar into the Compagnie des Indes Orientales.

A second Compagnie de Chine was established in 1698.

The Compagnie de Chine was reactivated in 1723.

See also

 List of trading companies

Notes

References
Mantienne, Frédéric 1999 Monseigneur Pigneau de Béhaine Eglises d'Asie, Série Histoire,  
Missions étrangères de Paris. 350 ans au service du Christ 2008 Editeurs Malesherbes Publications, Paris 

Trading companies
1660 establishments in France
French colonial empire